Engelhardia roxburghiana is a tree in the family Juglandaceae. It is named for the Scottish botanist William Roxburgh.

Description
The bark is fawn-coloured to dark brown to black. The inflorescences consist of eight to ten male catkins.

Distribution and habitat
Engelhardia roxburghiana grows naturally from India to Indochina and in Sumatra, Peninsular Malaysia and Borneo. Its habitat is mixed tropical forest from sea-level to  altitude.

References

roxburghiana
Flora of tropical Asia